The 2013–14 Tulane Green Wave men's basketball team represented Tulane University during the 2013–14 NCAA Division I men's basketball season. The Green Wave, led by fourth year head coach Ed Conroy, played their home games at Devlin Fieldhouse and were members of Conference USA. They finished the season 17–17, 8–8 in C-USA play to finish in seventh place. They advanced to the quarterfinals of the C-USA tournament where they lost to Tulsa. They were invited to the College Basketball Invitational where the lost in the first round to Princeton.

This was their final year in Conference USA as they prepared to move to the American Athletic Conference in July 2014.

Roster

Schedule

|-
!colspan=9 style="background:#00331A; color:#87CEEB;"|  Exhibition

|-
!colspan=9 style="background:#00331A; color:#87CEEB;"|  Regular season

|-
!colspan=9 style="background:#00331A; color:#87CEEB;"| Conference USA tournament

|-
!colspan=9 style="background:#00331A; color:#87CEEB;"| CBI

References

Tulane Green Wave men's basketball seasons
Tulane
Tulane
Tulane
Tulane